The Italian National Time Trial Championships are held annually to decide the Italian time trial champions across several categories of rider. Marco Pinotti has the most wins with 6 (4 in row). Marco Velo also had 3 wins in a row. In the women's event, Elisa Longo Borghini has the most titles with six.

Multiple winners

Men

Women

Men

Elite

U23

Women

See also
Italian National Road Race Championships
National Road Cycling Championships

Notes

References

External links
Cycling Stats

National road cycling championships
Cycle races in Italy
Recurring sporting events established in 1987
National championships in Italy
1987 establishments in Italy